Emma V. Kelley (February 8, 1867 – December 14, 1932) was an American educator and community organizer. She founded a women's organization, the Grand Temple of Daughter Elks.

Early life
Kelley was born as Emma Virginia Lee in Barrett's Neck, Nansemond County, Virginia, the daughter of John Lee and Agnes Walker Lee. She trained as a teacher at Hampton Normal Institute.

Career
Emma Kelley taught as a young woman, before she married. In widowhood, she moved to Norfolk, Virginia, where she founded the "Daughters of the Improved Benevolent and Protective Order of Elks of the World", the first women's auxiliary to the Improved Benevolent and Protective Order of Elks of the World (IBPOEW), a black fraternal organization, in 1903. The organization was affiliated with the National Council of Negro Women. She wrote a short history of the organization, published posthumously in 1943.

Personal life
Emma V. Lee married Robert Kelley in 1893. They had a daughter, Buena Vista Kelley. Emma V. Kelley was widowed in 1900. She died in 1932, aged 65 years. Her grave in Calvary Cemetery in Norfolk is included on historical tours of the cemetery. The Daughters of Elks national organization presents an annual Emma V. Kelley Achievement Award, named in her memory.

References

External links
 Letter from W. E. B. Du Bois to Emma V. Kelley (December 27, 1926), W. E. B. DuBois Papers, University of Massachusetts Amherst Special Collections and University Archives.

1867 births
1932 deaths
People from Suffolk, Virginia
People from Norfolk, Virginia